The Altered Augsburg Confession (Lat. Confessio Augustana Variata) is a later version of the Lutheran Augsburg Confession that includes substantial differences with regard to holy communion and the presence of Christ in bread and wine.

Philipp Melanchthon made several changes to the original Augsburg Confession in the years following its 1530 publication. Most of the changes were about the language of the confession.  In 1540 and 1542, he rewrote some parts of the confession in order to reconcile it with the views of Calvinists.  John Calvin himself did sign the 1540 version of the confession.

The most important difference between the Variata and the Augsburg Confession is in the theology of Real Presence. The Unaltered Augsburg Confession states:
"Concerning the Lord's Supper, they teach that the body and blood of Christ are truly present, and are distributed (communicated) to those that eat in the Lord's Supper. And they disapprove of those that teach otherwise."
Altered Augsburg Confession states:
"Concerning the Lord's Supper, they teach that 'with' bread and wine are truly exhibited the body and blood of Christ to those that eat in the Lord's Supper."

Lutheran churches often specify that they agree to the Unaltered Augsburg Confession as opposed to the altered version.

External links
 The Augsburg Confession (1530) in Latin with a parallel English translation and with notes on the differences in the 1540 edition; from Philip Schaff's Creeds of the Evangelical Protestant Churches at the Christian Classics Ethereal Library

Christian statements of faith